Brian O'Connell or Bryan O'Connell may refer to:

 Brian O'Connell (advocate) (1930–2011), American author, academic, and public administrator
 Brian O'Connell (musician) (born 1963), American instrumentalist and composer
 Brian O'Connell (hurler) (born 1984), Irish hurler
 Bryan O'Connell, musician in Si Schroeder's band

See also
 Brian Connell (born 1956), New Zealand politician